Nhyiaeso is one of the constituencies represented in the Parliament of Ghana. It elects one Member of Parliament (MP) by the first past the post system of election. Nhyiaeso is located in the Kumasi Metropolitan district  of the Ashanti Region of Ghana.

This seat was created prior to the  Ghanaian parliamentary election in 2004 and has been held by the New Patriotic Party since then.

The Member of Parliament for the Nhyiaeso Constituency is Stephen Amoah since 2017.

Boundaries 
The seat is located within the Kumasi Metropolitan District of the Ashanti Region of Ghana.

History 
The constituency was first created in 2004 by the Electoral Commission of Ghana along with 29 other new ones, increasing the number of constituencies from 200 to 230.

Members of Parliament

Elections

See also 
 List of Ghana Parliament constituencies

References 

Parliamentary constituencies in the Ashanti Region
2004 establishments in Ghana